Clay is an unincorporated community and census-designated place (CDP) in Clay Township, Lancaster County, Pennsylvania, United States. It is located along U.S. Route 322 between Brickerville and Ephrata. As of the 2010 census the population was 1,559.

Geography
Clay is in northern Lancaster County, in the southern part of Clay Township. Clay is bordered by Hopeland to the west and northwest. US 322 leads northwest  to Quentin and southeast  to Ephrata.

Middle Creek, which forms the border between Clay Township and Elizabeth Township, runs through the west side of the community, flowing southeast towards Cocalico Creek, a tributary of the Conestoga River and part of the Susquehanna River watershed.

Demographics

References

Census-designated places in Lancaster County, Pennsylvania
Census-designated places in Pennsylvania